Phylinae is a subfamily of the plant bug family Miridae. Species of this family are found worldwide.

In research published in 2013, the subfamily Phylinae was reorganized. The tribe Auricillocorini is now considered a synonym of Hallodapini, and the tribe Pronotocrepini a synonym of the subtribe Cremnorrhina. New tribes were created under the new or resurrected names Decomiini, Exocarpocorini, Cremnorrhini, Nasocorini, and Semiini. The revised subfamily consists of nine tribes containing around 400 genera and over 2000 species.

 Subfamily Phylinae Douglas & Scott, 1865
 Tribe Cremnorrhinini Reuter, 1883 (sometimes spelled "Cremnorrhini")
 Subtribe Coatonocapsina Schuh & Menard, 2013
 Subtribe Cremnorrhina Reuter, 1883
 Tribe Decomiini Schuh & Menard, 2013
 Tribe Exaeretini Futon, 1875
 Tribe Hallodapini Van Duzee, 1916
 Tribe Leucophoropterini Schuh, 1974
 Subtribe Leucophoropterina Schuh, 1974
 Subtribe Tuxedoina Schuh & Menard, 2013
 Tribe Nasocorini Reuter, 1883
 Tribe Phylini Douglas & Scott, 1865
 Subtribe Keltoniina Schuh & Menard, 2013
 Subtribe Oncotylina Douglas & Scott, 1865
 Subtribe Phylina Douglas & Scott, 1865
 Tribe Pilophorini Douglas & Scott, 1876
 Tribe Semiini Knight, 1923
 Subtribe Exocarpocorina Schuh & Menard, 2013
 Subtribe Semiina Knight, 1923

Genera
Phylinae contains the following genera:

 Subfamily Phylinae Douglas & Scott, 1865
 Tribe Cremnorrhinini Reuter, 1883
 Subtribe Coatonocapsina Schuh & Menard, 2013
 Genus Austropsallus Schuh, 1974
 Genus Capecapsus Schuh, 1974
 Genus Coatonocapsus Schuh, 1974
 Genus Heterocapillus Wagner, 1960
 Genus Parasciodema Poppius, 1914
 Subtribe Cremnorrhinina Reuter, 1883
 Genus Amblytylus Fieber, 1858
 Genus Brachyceratocoris Knight, 1968
 Genus Calidroides Schwartz, 2005
 Genus Coquillettia Uhler, 1890
 Genus Cremnorrhinus Reuter, 1880
 Genus Dacota Uhler, 1872
 Genus Denticulophallus Schuh, 1974
 Genus Ethelastia Reuter, 1876
 Genus Euderon Puton, 1888
 Genus Excentricoris Carvalho, 1955
 Genus Guentherocoris Schuh & Schwartz, 2004
 Genus Harpocera Curtis, 1838
 Genus Leutiola Wyniger, 2012
 Genus Lopidodenus V. Putshkov, 1974
 Genus Lopus Hahn, 1833
 Genus Macrotylus Fieber, 1858
 Genus Orectoderus Uhler, 1876
 Genus Pachyxyphus Fieber, 1858
 Genus Paralopus Wagner, 1957
 Genus Pronotocrepis Knight, 1929
 Genus Shendina Linnavuori, 1975
 Genus Strophopoda Van Duzee, 1916
 Genus Teleorhinus Uhler, 1890
 Genus Ticua Wyniger, 2012
 Genus Utopnia Reuter, 1881
 Genus Zinjolopus Linnavuori, 1975
 Tribe Decomiini Schuh & Menard, 2013
 Genus Aurantiocoris Schuh & Schwartz, 2004
 Genus Decomia Poppius, 1915
 Genus Decomioides Schuh, 1984
 Genus Malaysiamiris Schuh, 1984
 Genus Malaysiamiroides Schuh, 1984
 Genus Rubrocuneocoris Schuh, 1984
 Tribe Exaeretini Futon, 1875
 Genus Anonychiella Reuter, 1912
 Genus Aphaenophyes Reuter, 1899
 Genus Atractotomimus Kiritshenko, 1952
 Genus Auchenocrepis Fieber, 1858
 Genus Brendaphylus Yasunaga, 2013
 Genus Camptotylus Fieber, 1860
 Genus Camptozorus Kerzhner, 1996
 Genus Chrysochnoodes Reuter, 1901
 Genus Compsonannus Reuter, 1902
 Genus Eumecotarsus Kerzhner, 1962
 Genus Eurycranella Reuter, 1904
 Genus Frotaphylus Carvalho, 1984
 Genus Gonoporomiris Henry & Schuh, 2002
 Genus Hadrophyes Puton, 1874
 Genus Hyalopsallus Carvalho & Schaffner, 1973
 Genus Megalodactylus Fieber, 1858
 Genus Moissonia Reuter, 1894
 Genus Opuna Kirkaldy, 1902
 Genus Pastocoris Reuter, 1879
 Genus Psallopsis Reuter, 1901
 Genus Randallopsallus Yasunaga, 2013
 Genus Tuponia Reuter, 1875
 Genus Voruchiella Poppius, 1912
 Genus Yotvata Linnavuori, 1964
 Tribe Hallodapini Van Duzee, 1916
 Genus Acrorrhinium Noualhier, 1895
 Genus Aeolocoris Reuter, 1903
 Genus Alloeomimus Reuter, 1910
 Genus Artchawakomius Yasunaga, 2012
 Genus Aspidacanthus Reuter, 1901
 Genus Auricillocoris Schuh, 1984
 Genus Azizus Distant, 1910
 Genus Bibundiella Poppius, 1914
 Genus Boopidella Reuter, 1907
 Genus Carinogulus Schuh, 1974
 Genus Chaetocapsus Poppius, 1914
 Genus Clapmarius Distant, 1904
 Genus Cleotomiris Schuh, 1984
 Genus Cleotomiroides Schuh, 1984
 Genus Cremnocephalus Eieber, 1860
 Genus Cyrtopeltocoris Reuter, 1876
 Genus Diocoris Kirkaldy, 1902
 Genus Eminoculus Schuh, 1974
 Genus Formicopsella Poppius, 1914
 Genus Gampsodema Odhiambo, 1960
 Genus Glaphyrocoris Reuter, 1903
 Genus Hadrodapus Linnavuori, 1996
 Genus Hallodapomimus Herczek, 2000
 Genus Hallodapus Eieber, 1858
 Genus Ifephylus Linnavuori, 1993
 Genus Kapoetius Schmitz, 1969
 Genus Laemocoris Reuter, 1879
 Genus Leaina Linnavuori, 1974
 Genus Leptomimus Herczek & Popov, 2010
 Genus Lestonisca Carvalho, 1988
 Genus Linacoris Carvalho, 1983
 Genus Lissocapsus Bergroth, 1903
 Genus Malgacheocoris Carvalho, 1952
 Genus Mimocoris J. Scott, 1872
 Genus Myombea China & Carvalho, 1951
 Genus Myrmicomimus Reuter, 1881
 Genus Neolaemocoris Wagner, 1975
 Genus Omphalonotus Reuter, 1876
 Genus Pangania Poppius, 1914
 Genus Paralaemocoris Linnavuori, 1964
 Genus Phoradendrepulus Polhemus & Polhemus, 1985
 Genus Podullahas Schuh, 1984
 Genus Pongocoris Linnavuori, 1975
 Genus Ribautocapsus Wagner, 1962
 Genus Ruwaba Linnavuori, 1975
 Genus Skukuza Schuh, 1974
 Genus Sohenus Distant, 1910
 Genus Syngonus Bergroth, 1926
 Genus Systellonotidea Poppius, 1914
 Genus Systellonotopsis Poppius, 1914
 Genus Systellonotus Pieber, 1858
 Genus Trichophorella Reuter, 1905
 Genus Trichophthalmocapsus Poppius, 1914
 Genus Vitsikamiris Polhemus, 1994
 Genus Wygomiris Schuh, 1984
 Genus Zaratus Distant, 1909
 Tribe Leucophoropterini Schuh, 1974
 Subtribe Leucophoropterina Schuh, 1974
 Genus Abuyogocoris Schuh, 1984
 Genus Aitkenia Carvalho & Gross, 1982
 Genus Arafuramiris Schuh, 1984
 Genus Ausejanus Menard & Schuh, 2011
 Genus Austrodapus Menard & Schuh, 2011
 Genus Biromiris Schuh, 1984
 Genus Blesingia Carvalho & Gross, 1982
 Genus Collessicoris Carvalho & Gross, 1982
 Genus Ctypomiris Schuh, 1984
 Genus Gulacapsus Schuh, 1984
 Genus Johnstonsonius Menard & Schuh, 2011
 Genus Leucophoroptera Poppius, 1921
 Genus Missanos Menard & Schuh, 2011
 Genus Neaitkenia Menard & Schuh, 2011
 Genus Neoleucophoroptera Menard & Schuh, 2011
 Genus Papuamimus Schuh, 1984
 Genus Papuamiroides Menard & Schuh, 2011
 Genus Pseudohallodapocoris Schuh, 1984
 Genus Sejanus Distant, 1910
 Genus Solomonomimus Schuh, 1984
 Genus Transleucophoroptera Menard & Schuh, 2011
 Genus Trichocephalocapsus Schuh, 1984
 Genus Waterhouseana Carvalho, 1973
 Subtribe Tuxedoina Schuh & Menard, 2013
 Genus Ephippiocoris Poppius, 1912
 Genus Pseudophylus Yasunaga, 1999
 Genus Tuxedo Schuh, 2001
 Tribe Nasocorini Reuter, 1883
 Genus Adenostomocoris Schuh & Schwartz, 2004
 Genus Agrametra Buchanan-White, 1878
 Genus Arctostaphylocoris Schuh & Schwartz, 2004
 Genus Atomophora Reuter, 1879
 Genus Atomoscelis Reuter, 1875
 Genus Atractotomoidea Yasunaga, 1999
 Genus Atractotomus Fieber, 1858
 Genus Badezorus Distant, 1910
 Genus Beckocoris Knight, 1968
 Genus Bergmiris Carvalho, 1984
 Genus Boopidocoris Reuter, 1879
 Genus Caiganga Carvalho & Becker, 1957
 Genus Camptotylidea Wagner, 1957
 Genus Campylomma Reuter, 1878
 Genus Chinacapsus Wagner, 1961
 Genus Chlamydatus Curtis, 1833
 Genus Chlamyopsallus Schwartz, 2005
 Genus Hambletoniola Carvalho, 1954
 Genus Helenocoris Schmitz, 1976
 Genus Hirtopsallus Schmitz, 1976
 Genus Insulopus Schmitz, 1976
 Genus Karocris V. Putshkov, 1975
 Genus Kasumiphylus Schwartz & Stonedahl, 2004
 Genus Knightomiroides Stonedahl & Schwartz, 1996
 Genus Lamprosthenarus Poppius, 1914
 Genus Larinocerus
 Genus Lattinophylus Schuh, 2008
 Genus Lindbergopsallus Wagner, 1962
 Genus Lopsallus Schmitz, 1976
 Genus Maurodactylus Reuter, 1878
 Genus Megalopsallus Knight, 1927
 Genus Monosynamma J. Scott, 1864
 Genus Naresthus Schmitz, 1976
 Genus Nasocoris Reuter, 1879
 Genus Neisopsallus Schmitz, 1976
 Genus Neophylus Carvalho & Costa, 1992
 Genus Nevadocoris Knight, 1968
 Genus Nigrimiris Carvalho & Schaffner, 1973
 Genus Nigrocapillocoris Wagner, 1973
 Genus Oligobiella Reuter, 1885
 Genus Orthopidea Reuter, 1899
 Genus Phaxia Kerzhner, 1984
 Genus Phoenicocoris Reuter, 1875
 Genus Pinomiris Stonedahl & Schwartz, 1996
 Genus Pruneocoris Schuh & Schwartz, 2004
 Genus Psallomimus Wagner, 1951
 Genus Rhinacloa Reuter, 1876
 Genus Salicarus Kerzhner, 1962
 Genus Solenoxyphus Reuter, 1875
 Genus Spanagonicus Berg, 1883
 Genus Squamophylus Carvalho & Costa, 1992
 Genus Sthenaropsis Poppius, 1912
 Genus Taeniophorus Linnavuori, 1952
 Genus Tannerocoris Knight, 1970
 Genus Tapuruyunus Carvalho, 1946
 Genus Thymopsallus Linnavuori, 1975
 Genus Tijucaphylus Carvalho & Costa, 1992
 Genus Tunisiella Carapezza, 1997
 Genus Voruchia Reuter, 1879
 Tribe Phylini Douglas & Scott, 1865
 Subtribe Keltoniina Schuh & Menard, 2013
 Genus Keltonia Knight, 1966
 Genus Pseudatomoscelis Poppius, 1911
 Genus Reuteroscopus Kirkaldy, 1905
 Genus Waupsallus Linnavuori, 1975
 Subtribe Oncotylina Douglas & Scott, 1865
 Genus Acrotelus Reuter, 1885
 Genus Alloeotarsus Reuter, 1885
 Genus Americodema T. Henry, 1999
 Genus Angelopsallus Schuh, 2006
 Genus Antepia Seidenstiicker, 1962
 Genus Arizonapsallus Schuh, 2006
 Genus Asciodema Reuter, 1878
 Genus Bisulcopsallus Schuh, 2006
 Genus Brachyarthrum Fieber, 1858
 Genus Cariniocoris T. Henry, 1989
 Genus Ceratopsallus Schuh, 2006
 Genus Cercocarpopsallus Schuh, 2006
 Genus Chlorillus Kerzhner, 1962
 Genus Compsidolon Reuter, 1899
 Genus Crassomiris Weirauch, 2006
 Genus Damioscea Reuter, 1883
 Genus Dasycapsus Poppius, 1912
 Genus Europiella Reuter, 1909
 Genus Eurycolpus Reuter, 1875
 Genus Galbinocoris Weirauch, 2006
 Genus Glaucopterum Wagner, 1963
 Genus Hamatophylus Weirauch, 2006
 Genus Hoplomachus Fieber, 1858
 Genus Ihermocoris Puton, 1875
 Genus Insulaphylus Weirauch, 2006
 Genus Josifovius Konstantinov, 2008
 Genus Kmentophylus Duwal, Yasunaga, & Lee, 2010
 Genus Knightophylinia Schaffner, 1978
 Genus Knightopiella Schuh, 2004
 Genus Knightopsallus Schuh, 2006
 Genus Leucodellus Reuter, 1906
 Genus Lineatopsallus T. Henry, 1991
 Genus Litoxenus Reuter, 1885
 Genus Maculamiris Weirauch, 2006
 Genus Malacotes Reuter, 1878
 Genus Marrubiocoris Wagner, 1970
 Genus Megalocoleus Reuter, 1890
 Genus Moiseevichia Schuh, 2006
 Genus Nanopsallus Wagner, 1952
 Genus Neopsallus Schuh & Schwartz, 2004
 Genus Occidentodema T. Henry, 1999
 Genus Oligotylus Van Duzee, 1916
 Genus Omocoris Lindberg, 1930
 Genus Oncotylidea Wagner, 1965
 Genus Oncotylus Fieber, 1858
 Genus Opisthotaenia Reuter, 1901
 Genus Oreocapsus Linnavuori, 1975
 Genus Parachlorillus Wagner, 1963
 Genus Parapsallus Wagner, 1952
 Genus Paredrocoris Reuter, 1878
 Genus Phaeochiton Kerzhner, 1964
 Genus Phallospinophylus Weirauch, 2006
 Genus Phyllopidea Knight, 1919
 Genus Phymatopsallus Knight
 Genus Piceophylus Schwartz & Schuh, 1999
 Genus Pinophylus Schwartz & Schuh, 1999
 Genus Placochilus Fieber, 1858
 Genus Plagiognathus Fieber, 1858
 Genus Plesiodema Reuter, 1875
 Genus Pleuroxonotus Reuter, 1903
 Genus Pronototropis Reuter, 1879
 Genus Psallodema V. Putshkov, 1970
 Genus Psallomorpha Duwal Yasunaga, & Lee, 2010
 Genus Psallovius T. Henry
 Genus Pygovepres Weirauch, 2006
 Genus Quercophylus Weirauch, 2006
 Genus Quernocoris Weirauch, 2006
 Genus Ranzovius Distant, 1893
 Genus Rhinocapsus Uhler, 1890
 Genus Roburocoris Weirauch, 2009
 Genus Rubellomiris Weirauch, 2006
 Genus Rubeospineus Weirauch, 2006
 Genus Sacculifer Kerzhner, 1959
 Genus Salicopsallus Schuh, 2006
 Genus Schaffneropsallus Schuh, 2006
 Genus Stenoparia Fieber, 1870
 Genus Sthenaropsidea Henry & Schuh, 2002
 Genus Stictopsallus Schuh, 2006
 Genus Stirophylus Eckerlein & Wagner, 1965
 Genus Stoebea Schuh, 1974
 Genus Tapirula Carapezza, 1997
 Genus Tinicephalus Fieber, 1858
 Genus Tragiscocoris Fieber, 1861
 Genus Vanduzeephylus Schuh & Schwartz, 2004
 Genus Vesperocoris Weirauch, 2006
 Genus Viscacoris Weirauch, 2009
 Genus Zophocnemis Kerzhner, 1962
 Subtribe Phylina Douglas & Scott, 1865
 Genus Adelphophylus Wagner, 1959
 Genus Agraptocoris Reuter, 1903
 Genus Alnopsallus Duwal, Yasunaga, & Lee, 2010
 Genus Alvarengamiris Carvalho, 1991
 Genus Amazonophilus Carvalho & Costa, 1993
 Genus Anapsallus Odhiambo, 1960
 Genus Anomalocornis Carvalho & Wygodzinsky, 1945
 Genus Arlemiris Carvalho, 1984
 Genus Bicurvicoris Carvalho & Schaffner, 1973
 Genus Botocudomiris Carvalho, 1979
 Genus Brachycranella Reuter, 1905
 Genus Conostethus Fieber, 1858
 Genus Crassicornus Carvalho, 1945
 Genus Darectagela Linnavuori, 1975
 Genus Darfuromma Linnavuori, 1975
 Genus Dignaia Linnavuori, 1975
 Genus Dominiquella Linnavuori, 1983
 Genus Ectagela Schmidt, K., 1939
 Genus Ellacapsus Yasunaga, 2013
 Genus Eremophylus Yasunaga, 2001
 Genus Farsiana Linnavuori, 1998
 Genus Gediocoris Wagner, 1964
 Genus Ghazalocoris Linnavuori, 1975
 Genus Gressittocapsus Schuh, 1984
 Genus Icodema Reuter, 1875
 Genus Indatractus Linnavuori, 1975
 Genus Izyaius Schwartz, 2006
 Genus Juniperia Linnavuori, 1965
 Genus Knightensis Schaffner, 1978
 Genus Lalyocoris Linnavuori, 1993
 Genus Lasiolabopella Schuh, 1974
 Genus Lepidargyrus Muminov, 1962
 Genus Lepidocapsus Poppius, 1914
 Genus Leptoxanthus Reuter, 1905
 Genus Liviopsallus Carapezza, 1982
 Genus Mendozaphylus Carvalho & Carpintero, 1991
 Genus Millerimiris Carvalho, 1951
 Genus Mixtecamiris Carvalho & Schaffner, 1973
 Genus Natalophylus Schuh, 1974
 Genus Nubaia Linnavuori, 1975
 Genus Orthonotus Stephens, 1829
 Genus Parafulvius Carvalho, 1954
 Genus Paravoruchia Wagner, 1959
 Genus Phylus Hahn, 1831
 Genus Plagiognathidea Poppius, 1914
 Genus Platyscytisca Costa & Henry, 1999
 Genus Platyscytus Reuter, 1907
 Genus Porophoroptera Carvalho & Gross, 1982
 Genus Psallus Fieber, 1858
 Genus Roudairea Puton & Reuter, 1886
 Genus Sasajiophylus Yasunaga, 2001
 Genus Somalocoris Linnavuori, 1975
 Genus Sthenarus Fieber, 1858
 Genus Stibaromma Odhiambo, 1961
 Genus Tibiopilus Carvalho & Costa, 1993
 Genus Trevessa China, 1924
 Genus Villaverdea Carvalho, 1990
 Genus Widdringtoniola Schuh, 1974
 Genus Zakanocoris V. Putshkov, 1970
 Genus Zanchiophylus Duwal, Yasunaga, & Lee, 2010
 Tribe Pilophorini Douglas & Scott, 1876
 Genus Alepidiella Poppius, 1914
 Genus Aloea Linnavuori, 1975
 Genus Dilatops Weirauch, 2006
 Genus Druthmarus Distant, 1909
 Genus Ethatractus Linnavuori, 1975
 Genus Hypseloecus Reuter, 1891
 Genus Lasiolabops Poppius, 1914
 Genus Neoambonea Schuh, 1974
 Genus Parambonea Schuh, 1974
 Genus Parasthenaridea Miller, 1937
 Genus Pherolepis Kulik, 1968
 Genus Pilophorus Hahn, 1826
 Genus Pseudambonea Schuh, 1974
 Genus Randallophorus Henry, 2013
 Genus Spinolosus Zou, 1985
 Genus Sthenaridea Reuter, 1885
 Tribe Semiini Knight, 1923
 Subtribe Exocarpocorina Schuh & Menard, 2013
 Genus Ampimpacoris Weirauch & Schuh, 2011
 Genus Ancoraphylus Weirauch, 2007
 Genus Araucanophylus Carvalho, 1984
 Genus Basileobius Eyles & Schuh, 2003
 Genus Chiloephylus Carvalho, 1984
 Genus Cyrtodiridius Eyles & Schuh, 2003
 Genus Exocarpocoris Weirauch, 2007
 Genus Gonzalezinus Carvalho, 1981
 Genus Halormus Eyles & Schuh, 2003
 Genus Harpagophylus Schuh & Weirauch, 2010
 Genus Jiwarli Soto & Weirauch, 2007
 Genus Leptidolon Reuter, 1904
 Genus Mecenopa Eyles & Schuh, 2003
 Genus Melaleucoides Schuh & Weirauch, 2010
 Genus Pimeleocoris Eyles & Schuh, 2003
 Genus Polyozus Eyles & Schuh, 2003
 Genus Thryptomenomiris Schuh & Weirauch, 2010
 Genus Wallabicoris Schuh & Pedraza, 2010
 Genus Xiphoidellus Weirauch & Schuh, 2011
 Genus Xiphoides Eyles & Schuh, 2003
 Subtribe Semiina Knight, 1923
 Genus Criocoris Fieber, 1858
 Genus Hoplomachidea Reuter, 1909
 Genus Karoocapsus Schuh, 1974
 Genus Monocris V. Putshkov, 1974
 Genus Monospatha Eyles & Schuh 2003
 Genus Myrmicopsella Poppius, 1914
 Genus Nicholia Knight, 1929
 Genus Parapseudosthenarus Schuh, 1974
 Genus Pseudosthenarus Poppius, 1914
 Genus Rakula Odhiambo, 1967
 Genus Semium Reuter, 1876
 Genus Thoth Linnavuori, 1993
 Genus Tytthus Fieber, 1864

References

 
 

 
Hemiptera subfamilies